Air Commodore Cecil George Wigglesworth,  (17 October 1893 – 8 August 1961) was a Royal Air Force (RAF) officer and cricketer. A right-handed batsman, he played a first-class match for the Royal Air Force against the Royal Navy in August 1927. In 1930, he played for the Straits Settlements against the Federated Malay States in Kuala Lumpur.

In the RAF, Wigglesworth reached the rank of air commodore. By some accounts he was the original of Biggles. He served in Iceland during the Second World War, where one of his fellow officers was the original of Just William.

See also
 Philip Wigglesworth

References

1893 births
1961 deaths
Companions of the Order of the Bath
English cricketers
People from Tadcaster
Recipients of the Air Force Cross (United Kingdom)
Royal Air Force cricketers
Royal Air Force officers
Royal Air Force personnel of World War II
Royal Naval Air Service aviators
Royal Naval Air Service personnel of World War I
Sportspeople from Yorkshire
Straits Settlements cricketers